Albaji (also Romanized as Albājī and Ālbājī; also known as Albājī-ye Jadīd, Kamp-e Albājī, and Labājī) is a village in Elhayi Rural District, in the Central District of Ahvaz County, Khuzestan Province, Iran. At the 2006 census, its population was 1,867, in 316 families.

References 

Populated places in Ahvaz County